Run for Your Wife is a 2012 British comedy film, based on the 1983 theatre farce Run for Your Wife, written by Ray Cooney, who along with John Luton also directed the film. Upon release, the film promptly received universally negative reviews from critics and has been referred to as one of the worst films of all time, after it grossed just £602 in its opening weekend. It was released on 14 February 2013.

Plot
The story of London cab driver John Smith, with two wives, two lives, and a very precise schedule for juggling them both. With one wife, Michelle, at home in Stockwell and another, Stephanie, at home in Finsbury.

Trouble brews when Smith intervenes in a mugging. After being hit on the head, he ends up in hospital. This upsets his schedule and causes both wives to report him missing. Smith becomes hopelessly entangled in his attempts with Gary, his doltish ne'er-do-well neighbour downstairs in Stockwell, to explain himself to his wives and two suspicious police officers.

Cast
Danny Dyer	– John Smith
Neil Morrissey – Gary Gardner
Denise van Outen – Michelle Smith
Sarah Harding – Stephanie Smith
Kellie Shirley – Susie Browning
Christopher Biggins – Bobby Franklin
Lionel Blair – Cyril
Nicholas Le Prevost – D. S. Porterhouse
Ben Cartwright – D. S. Troughton
Derek Griffiths – Stockwell Police Officer
Nick Wilton – Taxi Driver
Jeffrey Holland – Dick Holland
Louise Michelle – Frances
Mike Smithies - Grumpy Oldman
Paul Curran - The Liar
Mark Foxwell - The Ghost

Cameo roles (alphabetical)
Russ Abbot – Hospital patient
Robin Askwith – Bus driver
Lynda Baron – Nurse
Richard Briers – Newspaper seller; Briers originated the role of John Smith in the West End.
Tony Britton – Man on bus
Jess Conrad – Piano player
Tom Conti – Actor
Wendy Craig – Nanny
Bernard Cribbins – Hospital patient; Cribbins originated the role of (Stanley) Gardner in the West End.
Barry Cryer – Busker
Ian Cullen – Wrinkled Man
Pamela Cundell – War Widow
Geoffrey Davies – Man in theatre queue
Judi Dench – Bag lady
Les Dennis - Man on street
Noel Edmonds - Man in shop
Jean Fergusson - Exercising woman
Derek Fowlds – Man in hat
William Gaunt – Man on bus
Liza Goddard – Exercising woman
Rolf Harris – Busker
Nicky Henson – Hospital patient
Louise Jameson – Doctors Receptionist
Vernon Kay - Plate-spinning man
Jeff Leach - Thief in shop
Maureen Lipman – Exercising woman
Katy Manning - Exercising woman 
Vicki Michelle – Tourist
Brian Murphy – Allotment man
Derren Nesbitt – Man on bus
Geoffrey Palmer – Man on toilet
Bill Pertwee – Man on bus; Pertwee originated the role of Porterhouse in the West End.
Jacki Piper - Nurse
Su Pollard – Newsagent 
Linda Regan - Allotment woman
Cliff Richard – Busker
Andrew Sachs – Clumsy waiter
Prunella Scales – Woman at pub
Jenny Seagrove – Taxi passenger
Donald Sinden – Man on bus
Pat Sharp - Man in flat
Sylvia Syms – Hip operation woman
Frank Thornton – Man getting off bus
Wanda Ventham – Lady on Bus
Marcia Warren – Woman on seat
Dennis Waterman – Minding Person
Giles Watling – Man in pub
Moray Watson – Man on bus
Timothy West – Man in pub
June Whitfield – Exercising woman
Finty Williams - Woman on bus
Simon Williams – Café customer
Mark Wingett – Man outside café

Production
Over 80 celebrities agreed to make cameo appearances having all agreed to donate their fees to a theatrical charity.  The executive producer is Vicki Michelle.

According to the end credits, there was a sequel planned based on Cooney’s later play Caught in the Net, but due to the disastrous box office returns the project was clearly scrapped. During filming Dyer was mistaken by onlookers for an actual taxi driver.

Reception
Run for Your Wife had so many overwhelmingly negative reviews upon release that the reviews themselves were widely reported in the UK media. The film was variously described as "a catastrophe", "as funny as leprosy" and "30 years past its sell-by date", with The Guardian reviewer Peter Bradshaw saying that it "makes The Dick Emery Show look edgy and contemporary".

The Independents Anthony Quinn wrote, "The stage play ran for nine years – it [the film] will be lucky to run for nine days. Perhaps never in the field of light entertainment have so many actors sacrificed so much dignity in the cause of so few jokes... From the look of it, Cooney hasn't been in a cinema for about 30 years". The cameo-heavy cast was commented upon by several reviewers, with the Metro commenting that "no one emerges unscathed among the cameo-packed cast that reads largely like a roll-call for Brit TV legends you'd previously suspected deceased".

The Daily Record described the film as "an exasperating farce containing not one single, solitary laugh.  people losing their trousers and falling over, the film looks like a pilot for a (mercifully) never-commissioned 70s sitcom". An article in the Independent described Run for Your Wife (along with the similarly badly received Movie 43) as contenders for the title of the "worst film in history".

The Berkhamsted & Tring Gazette reported "critics have being queuing up to batter recent release Run for Your Wife, with general agreement that it ranks among the worst British comedies of all time". The South African newspaper Daily News stated that "Run for Your Wife could be the worst film in history", the Studio Briefing website reported that "Some writers are making the case that the British comedy Run for Your Wife, written by and starring [sic] comedian Ray Cooney, may be “the worst film ever"”, and The Daily Mirror reported (a few months after its release) that Run For Your Wife "was branded the worst British film ever."

Run for Your Wife currently has a 0% rating on Rotten Tomatoes.

See also
List of films considered the worst

References

External links
 

2012 films
Plays by Ray Cooney
British comedy-drama films
British films based on plays
Films based on works by Ray Cooney
Films set in apartment buildings
Films set in London
British sex comedy films
Polygamy in fiction
2010s sex comedy films
2012 comedy films
2010s English-language films
2010s British films